Breakbeat Science Recordings was a drum and bass record label and record store of the same name based in Manhattan in New York City, New York; both the label and the store were founded in 1996, and a website was launched in 1997. Breakbeat Science was the first store dedicated to Drum and Bass music in the US, at the time of its opening the scene was still primarily based in the UK.

Breakbeat Science moved several times over the years.  The first location was on 9th Street and the store later moved to Orchard Street, both in Manhattan's East Village. After the Orchard Street location closed, the remaining backstock was moved to the Halcyon record shop in Dumbo, Brooklyn.

The label has been associated with a number of respected DJs and producers, including DJ DB and DJ Dara, who along with Paul Morris and Sean "Shooter" own the store and label, and also Pieter K, DJ Abstract, and AK1200. Other former employees include DJ Reid Speed (who later founded Play Me Records) and DJ Clever (who later founded Offshore Recordings). It has also brought releases by UK acts High Contrast, London Elektricity, Klute, and others to the United States, along with releases from acts outside the US or UK, like the Norwegian duo Rawthang; Breakbeat Science often works with other labels (for example, Hospital Records, the home of both High Contrast and London Elektricity) to do this. The label has no branches outside of the United States, but it does have a sublabel, Orgone that cultivates American talent.
Official Website
Discogs entry

Breakbeat Science Recordings should not be confused with Breakbeat Science, a short-lived label with only one release (in 1999) according to Discogs: .

References

Drum and bass record labels